Callum Wilkinson (born 14 March 1997) is a British race walker. As of 2017, he was ranked 2nd overall in the UK for 20 Km walk. He represented his country in the 20 km walk at the 2017 World Championships finishing in 41st position. He won a gold medal in the 10,000 m walk at the IAAF World U20 Championships in Bydgoszcz, Poland. At the 2019 European Athletics U23 Championships in Gävle, Sweden. He won a bronze medal in the 20 kilometres walk.

He became a double British champion when successfully defending his title and winning the 5000 metres walk event at the 2020 British Athletics Championships in a time of 19 min 25.94 secs.

Callum represented Great Britain at the 20km race walk at the 2020 Summer Olympics. He came tenth in a time of 1:22:38.

References

External links
 
 
 
 
 
 
 
 

1997 births
Living people
British male racewalkers
English male racewalkers
Olympic athletes of Great Britain
Athletes (track and field) at the 2020 Summer Olympics
Commonwealth Games competitors for England
Athletes (track and field) at the 2018 Commonwealth Games
World Athletics Championships athletes for Great Britain
World Athletics U20 Championships winners
British Athletics Championships winners